Mycoplasma buccale  is a species of bacteria in the genus Mycoplasma. This genus of bacteria lacks a cell wall around their cell membrane. Without a cell wall, they are unaffected by many common antibiotics such as penicillin or other beta-lactam antibiotics that target cell wall synthesis. Mycoplasma are the smallest bacterial cells yet discovered, can survive without oxygen and are typically about 0. 1  µm in diameter.

It was first described in 1974 and is considered a rare inhabitant of humans. The type strain is strain ATCC 23636 = CIP 105530 = IFO (now NBRC) 14851 = NCTC 10136. This species is noted for its ability to recover from the damaging effects of UV light, which usually is fatal to other mycoplasma species tested.

References

External links
Type strain of Mycoplasma buccale at BacDive -  the Bacterial Diversity Metadatabase

Bacteria described in 1974
buccale